The 2016 Ole Miss Rebels football team represented the University of Mississippi in the 2016 NCAA Division I FBS football season. The Rebels played their home games at the newly renovated Vaught–Hemingway Stadium in Oxford, Mississippi and competed in the Western Division of the Southeastern Conference (SEC). They were led by fifth-year head coach Hugh Freeze in what would turn out to be his final season with the Rebels. They finished the season 5–7, 2–6 in SEC play to finish in last place in the Western Division.

On February 11, 2019, Ole Miss announced the vacation of all wins in the years 2010, 2011, 2012, and 2016. In 2013, all wins except the Music City Bowl were vacated. In 2014, all wins except the Presbyterian game were vacated.

Previous season and offseason

2015 season

Ole Miss's 2015 season began with easy victories over FCS foe UT-Martin and the Mountain West's Fresno State, and continued their momentum by defeating then-no.2 Alabama on the road, which would become the signature victory of the Rebels' 2015 campaign. Ole Miss then rose to no.3 in the AP Poll, and although they were heavy favorites in their next matchup against Vanderbilt, they struggled mightily, but ultimately emerged victorious. They Rebels maintained their no.3 ranking before getting blown out by Florida on the road and fell to no.14 before bouncing back against New Mexico State. The Rebels entered their next game with a #13 ranking against rival Memphis, in what was one of the most anticipated in the history of Memphis football. Ole Miss, despite being double digit favorites, lost by 13 points, causing them to fall 11 spots in the rankings to no.24. The Rebels followed with two wins against SEC West opponents Texas A&M and Auburn and climbed to no.18 in the rankings and controlled their own destiny the SEC West, but a heartbreaking loss to Arkansas the following week caused them to fall to second place in the SEC West and to fall out of the rankings for the first time since the 2013 season. However, Ole Miss finished the regular season with double digit wins over ranked SEC Rivals LSU and Mississippi State and rose to no.12 in the College Football Playoff poll, which earned them a Sugar Bowl berth for the first time since 1970, where they defeated no.16 Oklahoma State and ultimately finished ranked no.10 in the AP Poll, their first top-ten finish since 1969.

NCAA investigation
The offseason was a controversial one for the Rebels, where an ongoing NCAA investigation dominated college football headlines. The investigation began prior to the start of the 2015 season, where Ole Miss star offensive tackle Laremy Tunsil was arrested on charges of domestic violence after allegedly assaulting his stepfather, Lindsey Miller. Ole Miss coach Hugh Freeze announced that Tunsil was defending his mother, Desiree Tunsil. A police report that was released days after the incident stated that Miller claimed Tunsil was "riding around with football agents" and that when a deputy arrived at the scene of the incident, "Tunsil and the agents" left in a yellow convertible. Days later, NCAA officials interviewed Miller about allegations of multiple violations of rules by the Ole Miss football program; Hugh Freeze later dismissed the possibility of a violation of rules, saying he's confident his program "always does the right thing". In August 2015, Tunsil and Miller agreed to drop charges against each other and sign dismissal forms. However, Tunsil was suspended from the first seven games of the 2015 season, making his debut against Texas A&M. In October 2015, Ole Miss announced that Tunsil used three loaner vehicles over a six-month period without payment, among other impermissible benefits.

Only a few days later, an NCAA investigation of Louisiana Lafayette revealed that former Ole Miss coach David Saunders may have committed violations while at Ole Miss. Saunders allegedly helped five recruits receive fraudulent ACT scores at Wayne County High School, lied to the NCAA about his involvement and failed to cooperate with the subsequent investigation. He also allegedly gave a total of $6,500 to a player over the course of two semesters while at Louisiana Lafayette.

In January 2016, after the Rebels' Sugar Bowl victory over Oklahoma State, Ole Miss received a notice of allegations from the NCAA. However, Ole Miss athletic director Ross Bjork stated that the majority of the violations occurred before his arrival at Ole Miss and before the hiring of Hugh Freeze. In February, Bjork said that the NCAA has completed its investigation of Ole Miss's football program, and also stated that he did not expect a "second letter" from the NCAA concerning additional violations and that Freeze was not named by the NCAA in any wrongdoing.

At this point, the investigation was seemingly coming to an end, but on the night of the NFL Draft, Laremy Tunsil's Instagram account was hacked, and a video of him smoking a bong fashioned out of a gas mask is posted, as well as photos of text messages where Tunsil asks for money from an Ole Miss administrator. When asked if he ever received money while at Ole Miss, Tunsil admitted that he did, in fact, receive money.

As a result of the investigation, Ole Miss self-imposed an 11-scholarship reduction over the course of four seasons. Along with the reduction of scholarships, the school has also suspended two unnamed assistants from recruiting, fined itself $159,352 and required current staff to go through additional training on NCAA rules and policy. In August 2016, it was announced that NCAA investigators have interviewed players at rival SEC schools about their recruitment by Ole Miss. NCAA Enforcement representatives have visited Auburn and Mississippi State, along with perhaps one other unnamed SEC West school during the summer of 2016. The players were granted immunity from possible NCAA sanctions in exchange for truthful accounts of their recruitment.

2016 recruiting class
The 2016 National Signing Day was Wednesday, February 3, 2016. The Rebels signed a total of 24 prospects to a letter of intent, headlined by 5-star quarterback Shea Patterson and 5-star offensive tackle Greg Little and 5 star defensive tackle Benito Jones. According to 247Sports.com. The Rebels' 2016 recruiting class is considered to be the best in school history, surpassing the 2013 class.

Coaching staff

Schedule
Ole Miss announced its 2016 football schedule on October 29, 2015. The 2016 schedule consists of 7 home games, 5 away games and 1 neutral site game in the regular season. The Rebels will host SEC foes Alabama, Auburn, Georgia, and Mississippi State, and will travel to Arkansas, LSU, Texas A&M, and Vanderbilt.

The Rebels hosted three of its four non–conference games against Georgia Southern from the Sun Belt Conference, Memphis from the American Athletic Conference and Wofford from the Southern Conference. Ole Miss started the season at a neutral site in Orlando, Florida on Labor Day against Florida State of the Atlantic Coast Conference.

Game summaries

No. 4 Florida State

Wofford

No. 1 Alabama

No. 12 Georgia

Memphis

No. 22 Arkansas

No. 25 LSU

No. 15 Auburn

Georgia Southern

No. 10 Texas A&M

Vanderbilt

Mississippi State

Rankings

References

Ole Miss
Ole Miss Rebels football seasons
Ole Miss Rebels football